Ayelet Gundar-Goshen (Hebrew: איילת גונדר-גושן; born 1982) is an Israeli author.

Life 
Ayelet Gundar-Goshen was born in Israel. She has a master's degree in psychology from Tel Aviv University. During her studies, she worked as a journalist and news editor in the leading Israeli news paper, Yedioth Ahronoth. She also studied screenplay in Sam Spiegel Film and Television School in Jerusalem. She teaches at Tel Aviv University and the Holon Institute of Technology. She was a visiting author in San Francisco State University during 2018, and she is currently a visiting artist at University of California, Los Angeles.

Writing 
Gundar-Goshen writes screenplays for TV and cinema in Israel. One of her short scripts, Batman at the Checkpoint, won the Berlin Today Award for the best short film in 2012 on the Berlinale Talent Campus.

Her first novel, One Night, Markovitch (2012), won the Sapir Prize in 2013 for debut novels. The Hebrew novel was translated into thirteen languages. One Night, Markovitch won the Italian Adei-Wizo Prize (2016), which Gundar-Goshen shared with Etgar Keret, as well as the French Adei-Wizo Prize (2017). The novel was also long-listed for the Italian Sinbad Prize, and for Grand prix des lectrices de Elle.

Gundar-Goshen's second novel, Waking Lions (2014), was also translated into thirteen languages.  It won the 2017 Jewish Quarterly-Wingate Prize, which Gundar-Goshen shared with Philippe Sands.
The New York Times Book Review picked Waking Lions as an editors' choice, and The Wall Street Journal included the novel on its "Best Summer Reads" list. Mariella Frostrup picked Waking Lions as one of her Books of the Year 2016 in the Observer.

Gundar-Goshen is a contributor to BBC's the Cultural Frontline. She is also an occasional contributor to the Financial Times, Time and the Telegraph.

Novels 
 .
 One Night, Markovitch; London, Pushkin Press, 2015; new paperback ed.: 2015; Toronto, Anansi, 2015
 .
 Waking Lions; London, Pushkin Press, 2016; paperback: 2016; New York, Little, Brown
 .
 Liar, 2017
 .
 Where the Wolf Lurks, August 2023 (announced); New York, Little, Brown

References

External links 
 Ayelet Gundar-Goshen, the WorldCat Database
 Ayelet Gundar-Goshen, the Institute for the Translation of Hebrew Literature

Academic staff of Tel Aviv University
Israeli psychologists
Israeli women psychologists
1982 births
Israeli journalists
Tel Aviv University alumni
Living people
Israeli women journalists
Israeli novelists
Israeli women novelists
Israeli female screenwriters
Israeli newspaper editors
Yedioth Ahronoth people
BBC people
Financial Times people
Time (magazine) people
The Daily Telegraph people